The 2015 Northeast Conference women's basketball tournament was held between March 8, 11, and 15, 2015. The 2015 Northeast Conference tournament featured the league's top eight seeds. The tourney opened on March 8 with the quarterfinals, followed by the semifinals on March 11, and the finals on March 15. The champions, St. Francis Brooklyn, earned a trip to the 2015 NCAA tournament.

Bracket

All games will be played at the venue of the higher seed

All-tournament team
Tournament MVP in bold.

References

 
Northeast Conference women's basketball tournament
Northeast Conference women's basketball tournament